Susan Akin (born August 12, 1964) is an American beauty pageant titleholder from Meridian, Mississippi who was Miss Mississippi 1985 and Miss America 1986.

Early life and education
Akin was born to Earl and Dorothy Akin on August 12, 1964. She was a member of Pi Beta Phi sorority at the University of Mississippi.

Pageantry
Before the Miss America 1986 pageant, computer modeling successfully predicted that Akin would be named Miss America, her odds set at 7 to 1. During her pageant years, Akin participated in over 110 pageants.

Career

Akin traveled extensively with Bob Hope, performing at conventions both in Las Vegas and Atlantic City, New Jersey.

Akin was formerly the spokesperson for the National Down's Syndrome Association, during which she spoke before state legislatures and advocacy groups.

In 1991, Akin appeared in a segment on Unsolved Mysteries to discuss the unexplained death of Crystal Spencer, an aspiring actress who died in the same apartment building where Akin and her husband, Jet Taylor, lived in 1988.

Controversies
She is the granddaughter of Bernard L. Akin, a conspirator in the murders of Chaney, Goodman, and Schwerner of 1964. The Meridian Star reported Akin's response to her grandfather's involvement, "That's something that doesn't involve me. I wasn't even born and can't be involved in this. And the people who have taken it out of context thinking they can drag me down, cannot and they're not."

Akin openly opposed mixed marriages with the New York Press quoting her as saying, "I feel at this time intermixing could lead to more problems."

Personal life
After crowning Kellye Cash as her successor, Akin moved to Los Angeles in 1987 to pursue a career in acting, but soon fell into alcoholism. In the late 1980s, Akin became addicted to opiates after being injured in a car accident. She moved back to Mississippi and soon married Jetson "Jet" Taylor and gave birth to a daughter, Alexandria, in 1992. Taylor and Akin divorced in 1994.

In 1996, Akin married Brooks Lynch. She continued to struggle with addiction, ultimately leading to a suicide attempt in 1999.

Akin and Lynch had a son, Preston Lynch, in 2001.

References

External links
 

1965 births
Living people
Miss America 1980s delegates
Miss America Preliminary Swimsuit winners
Miss America winners
People from Meridian, Mississippi
University of Mississippi alumni
Miss Mississippi winners